Chochenyo Park, formerly known as Jackson Park and Alameda Park, is a small municipal park in Alameda, California located on Park Avenue south of Encinal Avenue, one block off of the Park Street business district. 

In July 2020, the Recreation and Parks Commission voted to rename Jackson Park and remove the signage honoring Andrew Jackson, the park's namesake. Chochenyo Park was chosen and made official in January 2021.

Toponymy
Chochenyo refers to a division of the Ohlone tribe, who were the original inhabitants of Alameda island.

History
In 1867, the Alameda Park Tract was subdivided as a residential area for the rich. The center of Park Avenue included a 100-foot-wide and 1,200 foot-long oval park.
In 1894, after a multiyear effort to condemn the properties of absentee owners, the City gained title to land of the park. The park was established in 1895. 
Named originally as Alameda Park*, it was renamed Jackson Park in 1909 for President Andrew Jackson.

Rename Jackson Park 
In 2018, Alameda residents started a petition drive to rename Jackson Park due to Andrew Jackson's treatment of African and Native American peoples. The City of Alameda Recreation and Park Commission did not act on the request to rename the park.

In September 2020, after the police murder of George Floyd, the Commission and City Council unanimously voted to rename the park.

Amenities
The park formerly known as Jackson Park is a "passive park." There are no play structures, fields, or courts. The key elements are the tree-lined park, benches, including the Clark Memorial Bench, and the bandstand.

Clark Bench 
The park is the subject to local folklore. At one end of the park is a large concrete bench with a plaque reading "In Memory of My Dumb Friends." Although many believe the bench is a reference to the singer Jim Morrison, known to hang out and smoke when he lived in Alameda, the bench was a gift from Isabelle Clark in 1920, in honor of her husband.

Bandstand 
The bandstand was originally constructed in 1890. Residents replaced the bench in the early 2000s.

See also 
 List of name changes due to the George Floyd protests

References 

Municipal parks in California